Born on a Tuesday is a 2016 novel by Nigeria writer Elnathan John. It is his debut novel. It was published in 2016 by Black Cat an imprint of Grove Press.

Plot summary
Born on a Tuesday centers on Dantala, a young boy from the family of Sheikh's who struggles to cope up with the religious and political lines in North West Nigeria.

Reception
On 2016, it was shortlisted for the Nigeria Prize for Literature. Also, on 2017, it was Longlisted for the Etisalat Prize for African Literature. It was also shortlisted for the Republic of Consciousness Prize, He also won Betty Trask Award for Born on a Tuesday. It made to the Top 10 Nigerian Books of 2019 by Channels Television.

References

2016 Nigerian novels
Political novels
Anti-war novels
2016 debut novels
Grove Press books